Wallace Williams (born October 23, 1946) is a long-distance runner who represents the United States Virgin Islands. He competed in the men's marathon at the 1988 Summer Olympics.

References

1946 births
Living people
Athletes (track and field) at the 1979 Pan American Games
Athletes (track and field) at the 1988 Summer Olympics
United States Virgin Islands male long-distance runners
United States Virgin Islands male marathon runners
Olympic track and field athletes of the United States Virgin Islands
Pan American Games competitors for the United States Virgin Islands
Place of birth missing (living people)